Laru (Laro, also Shen or Sengwe) is a minor Kainji language of Nigeria. It has one dialect: Cuba (Shuba). Speakers are shifting to Busa.

Dialects
There are three dialects of Shen, spoken in the following villages.

 Kárábàndéi and Sànsání
 Sàːgúnú4, Sʷàʃí, Lúmːà, and Barkatai
 Mɔ̀nːáĩ, Sáŋkʷà, and Màláːlé

The major villages, ordered from largest to smallest, are Sàːgúnú, Kárábàndéi, Sʷàʃí, Lúmːà, and Mɔ̀nːáĩ. There are fewer than 4,000 speakers.

Ethnologue (22nd ed.) lists Laru villages as Karabonde, Leshigbe, Luma, Monnai, Sansanni, and Shagunu.

References

Kainji languages
Languages of Nigeria